Tetraponera nigra, is a species of ant of the subfamily Myrmicinae, which can be found in Borneo, Philippines, Bangladesh, India, Sri Lanka, Thailand, China.

Subspecies
Tetraponera rufonigra ceylonensis (Forel, 1909)
Tetraponera rufonigra rufonigra (Jerdon, 1851)
Tetraponera rufonigra testaceonigra (Forel, 1903)
Tetraponera rufonigra yeensis (Forel, 1902)

References

External links

 at antwiki.org
Animaldiversity.org
Itis.org

Pseudomyrmecinae
Hymenoptera of Asia
Insects described in 1851